Caíque da Silva Santos (born 30 January 1994), simply known as Caíque, is a Brazilian footballer who plays for Frei Paulistano on loan from Campinense Clube as a forward.

Club career
Born in Osasco, São Paulo, Caíque graduated from Botafogo-SP's youth setup, after starting it out at Atlético Sorocaba. On 4 March 2012 he made his professional debut with the former's main squad, starting and being booked in a 3–2 away win against Oeste for the Campeonato Paulista championship.

On 18 February 2014, after being rarely used by his club, Caíque was loaned to Francana until the end of the year. He appeared regularly during his spell, returning to Fogão in the summer.

On 30 January 2015 Caíque moved to Série A club Atlético Paranaense, initially assigned to the under-23 squad.

References

External links
 

Caíque at playmakerstats.com (English version of ogol.com.br)

1994 births
Living people
People from Osasco
Brazilian footballers
Association football forwards
Botafogo Futebol Clube (SP) players
Associação Atlética Francana players
Club Athletico Paranaense players
Guaratinguetá Futebol players
Associação Ferroviária de Esportes players
Red Bull Brasil players
Londrina Esporte Clube players
Comercial Futebol Clube (Ribeirão Preto) players
Campinense Clube players
Footballers from São Paulo (state)